Lucky Ladies is a 1932 British comedy film directed by John Rawlins and starring Sydney Fairbrother, Emily Fitzroy and Tracy Holmes.

Plot summary
Some sisters inherit a large sum of money.

Cast
 Sydney Fairbrother as Angle Tuckett
 Emily Fitzroy as Cleo Honeycutt
 Tracy Holmes as Ted
Janice Adair as Pearl
 Syd Crossley as Hector Ramsbottom
 Charles Farrell as Bookmaker

References

External links

1932 films
1932 comedy films
Films directed by John Rawlins
British comedy films
British black-and-white films
1930s English-language films
1930s British films